"To The Bone" is a song by American rappers Quavo, Takeoff, and YoungBoy Never Broke Again from the former two's collaborative album Only Built for Infinity Links (2022). It was produced by Atake, Larzz and Sluzyyy.

Composition
The song finds Takeoff "[bending] time" and "[cramming] syllables" while Quavo melodically raps to the beat. YoungBoy on the other hand takes on a gangsta rap style. Critics note that it's an "imitation" of Migos' "Need It," also featuring YoungBoy.

Music video
In a 2023 podcast with YoungBoy Never Broke Again, he announced that Quavo and Takeoff - prior to his death - had flown out to Utah where YoungBoy is currently placed on house arrest to film the official music video, however, YoungBoy noted that he was in a bad mood and regretted canceling the video shoot: "they came out here to do the video, but I think something happened. And it had me in a f*cked up mood. So, I had canceled the video. I regret it, though. It's okay, though."

Personnel
Credits and personnel adapted from Tidal.

Musicians
 Anh Tuan Antoine Tran – production, composer, songwriter
 Chi Nhan Trieu – production, composer, songwriter
 Lars Engelbarts – production, composer, songwriter
 Quavious Keyate Marshall – lead artist, songwriter, composer
 Kirsnick Khari Ball – lead artist, songwriter, composer
 Kentrell DeSean Gaulden – lead artist, songwriter, composer

Technical
 Colin Leonard – master engineering
 Quavo – mixing
 DJ Durel – mixing
 DJ Durel – recording

Charts

References

2022 songs
Quavo songs
Takeoff (rapper) songs
YoungBoy Never Broke Again songs
Songs written by Quavo
Songs written by Takeoff (rapper)
Songs written by YoungBoy Never Broke Again